John Charles Fourcade, Jr. (born October 11, 1960) is a former professional American football quarterback in the National Football League for the New Orleans Saints and recent head coach of the New Mexico Stars of American Indoor Football. Fourcade was the most valuable player of the 1982 Senior Bowl after passing for 115 yards and running for 33 yards and two touchdowns. He had gained 6,713 yards at Ole Miss from 1978–1981, breaking the career record of Archie Manning.

Professional career
Fourcade played as an undrafted free agent in four games as a backup to Joe Paopao for the British Columbia Lions in 1983. As a career journeyman quarterback, he played for the 1984 Winnipeg Blue Bombers (CFL) and the 1985 Memphis Showboats (USFL) before being signed as a free agent by the New York Giants in May 1986. He then played for the 1987 Denver Dynamite in the Arena Football League. In 1987, he led the Saints to a 2-1 replacement game record and made the regular roster. Over his career, Fourcade passed for 2,312 yards in 24 games for the Saints, with a passer rating of 70.1. He was waived by the Saints in July 1991. In 1993, he played for the Miami Hooters of the AFL. In 2001, he was the general manager, head coach and played in the National Indoor Football League for the Mississippi Fire Dogs.

Coaching career
Prior to playing for the Saints in the replacement games, J. Fourcade was the QB coach at John Ehret High School, Marrero La. From 1986–1987. At John Ehret, Fourcade coached Kordell "Slash" Stewart. Fourcade played with the 1994 Milwaukee Mustangs (AFL), and Coached the 1995 Miami Hooters (AFL), the 1999-2000 Mississippi Fire Dogs (IPFL), the 2001 Mobile Seagulls/Louisiana Bayou Beast (NIFL), the 2002 Florida Firecats (af2), the 2003-2004 Columbus Wardogs (af2), the 2005 Tupelo FireAnts (UIF) and the 2006 Bossier-Shreveport Battle Wings (af2).

In the 2007 season, Fourcade was the head coach of the IFL's Fairbanks Grizzlies in Fairbanks, Alaska.

In the 2008 season, he led the Acadiana Mudbugs to the SIFL's first playoffs and finished the season 6-6. For the 2010 season, he was fired after the team's opening game loss (they had since been renamed the Lafayette Wildcatters) and replaced by ex-Arena League and Af2 Coach Skip Foster.

On August 20, 2009, it was announced that Fourcade would be the head coach of the Rio Grande Valley Magic SIFL team for its inaugural 2010 season.

John Fourcade has since left the SIFL and first moved on to the new Lone Star Football League, in which he was the head coach of the Rio Grande Valley Magic in the 2011 season.

On December 26, 2015 John Fourcade was announced as head coach of the Louisiana Cottonmouths indoor football team, but the team folded without ever competing before the season began.

In April 2016, Fourcade was named the head coach of the New Mexico Stars, an indoor football team.

Broadcasting career

Fourcade currently serves as an NFL football analyst for WDSU (NBC) New Orleans.

On September 5, 2013, the "John Fourcade Show presented by Ray Brandt" will premiere on WHNO TV (LeSEA Broadcasting) in the New Orleans area. John Fourcade will join with host Mike Detillier to discuss upcoming Saints, NFL, and LSU action.  The show will be shot on location at featured Ray Brandt automotive dealerships.

Personal life

Fourcade once dated Marla Maples.

Fourcade is the uncle of former Nicholls quarterback Chase Fourcade.

References

1960 births
Living people
People from Gretna, Louisiana
American football quarterbacks
Archbishop Shaw High School alumni
Players of American football from Louisiana
Ole Miss Rebels football players
American players of Canadian football
Canadian football quarterbacks
BC Lions players
Winnipeg Blue Bombers players
Denver Dynamite (arena football) players
New Orleans Saints players
Miami Hooters players
Arena Football League coaches
Memphis Showboats players
Florida Bobcats coaches
Af2 coaches
Florida Firecats coaches
Bossier–Shreveport Battle Wings coaches
National Football League replacement players